The Boston Society of Film Critics Award for Best Documentary Film is one of the annual film awards given by the Boston Society of Film Critics.

Winners

1980s

1990s

2000s

2010s

2020s

Multiple winners 
James Marsh - 2
Errol Morris - 2

See also 
Academy Award for Best Documentary Feature

References 

Boston Society of Film Critics Awards
American documentary film awards